Through Black Spruce is a 2018 Canadian drama film, directed by Don McKellar. An adaptation of Joseph Boyden's novel Through Black Spruce, the film stars Brandon Oakes, Tantoo Cardinal, Graham Greene, Tanaya Beatty, Parveen Kaur and Roseanne Supernault.
The film was shot primarily in Moosonee, Ontario.

Plot
Annie Bird, a Cree woman from Moosonee, is the identical twin of Susanna Bird, a model who had last been seen in Toronto before disappearing with her abusive boyfriend Gus. While living with her mother Lizette, Annie is close to her uncle Will, a hunter and former bush pilot. At the invitation of a friend, Annie travels to Toronto for a vacation, but stays behind to look for her sister. When Annie leaves for their vacation, a local Moosonee drug dealer named Marius takes this as an indication that one of her family members anticipates a need to go into hiding. Marius accuses Will of being a snitch and hires associates to have him followed.

In Toronto, Annie contacts Susanna's modelling agency and collects the last paycheque that she was owed. The agency refers her to Jesse, the last photographer to undertake a project with Susanna. The two meet while Jesse is debuting the resulting photo series at a local gallery. After describing the depression Susanna was in, Jesse gives Annie the address where she last stayed. There, Annie meets Violet who is the other tenant. Violet welcomes Annie and describes the shock of receiving the missing person's report for her roommate. Taking her to Susanna's former room, Violet encourages Annie to stay there for as long as necessary.

Meanwhile, Marius escalates his threats against Will's family and attempts to firebomb his house at night. The police chief dismisses Will's report due to his alcoholism and inability to provide a license plate number. Taking matters into his own hands, Will later aims a rifle at Marius from afar and fires a bullet into his head. Will escapes by plane to a remote island, and encounters a group of fellow Cree travelers after setting up a campsite. After being convinced that he cannot hide forever, Will returns to Moosonee.  His sister Lizette tells him that Marius survived the shot to the head, albeit with brain damage. The police chief comes to speak with Will, and initially announces that the attempted murder is being ruled as a "biker hit". However, before driving off, he tells Will to have better aim next time.

Meanwhile, in Toronto, Annie begins a relationship with Jesse and offers to take Susanna's place in an upcoming photo shoot. At a club that Susanna used to frequent, Violet introduces Annie to an acquaintance named Danny. Jesse warns her that Danny is a drug dealer but Violet continues to include him in their circle of friends. Annie looks at some of Susanna's production stills and sees that signs of drug use have been photoshopped away. She berates Jesse for his dishonesty and prepares to leave Toronto. While she is telling Violet, Danny corners the two of them and reveals that he has killed Gus in an effort to reclaim stolen drugs. While choking Annie, he accuses her of conspiring with her sister to keep the stash hidden.

Danny then comes to Moosonee in order to continue searching for Susanna. He throws boiling water at Lizette and beats Will with a golf club. Before he can deliver the killing blow, Annie arrives with Will's rifle. She kills Marius and Danny in time to help carry her uncle to the hospital.

Cast
Tanaya Beatty as Annie Bird
Brandon Oakes as Will
Kiowa Gordon as Jesse
Tantoo Cardinal as Mary-Lou
Graham Greene as Leo
Wesley French as Marius
Parveen Kaur as Geeta
Lily Gao as Lauren
Roseanne Supernault as Eva
Don McKellar as NOW reporter

Release
Through Black Spruce premiered at the 2018 Toronto International Film Festival.

The film received two Canadian Screen Award nominations at the 7th Canadian Screen Awards in 2019, for Best Actor (Oakes) and Best Original Score (Alaska B). Alaska B won the award for Best Original Score. Cinematographer Douglas Koch also received a nomination for the Canadian Society of Cinematographers Award for Theatrical Feature Cinematography.

In the United States, the film was released on DVD and Blu-ray as Black Spruce on December 17, 2019.

Reception
Norman Wilner of Now Toronto called the film "bland and uninvolving".

See also
Missing and murdered Indigenous women

References

External links

Through Black Spruce at Library and Archives Canada

Canadian drama films
Cree-language films
Films shot in Ontario
Films directed by Don McKellar
Films based on Canadian novels
First Nations films
Films set in Northern Ontario
Films set in Toronto
2010s English-language films
2010s Canadian films